Alan Sun Kim (born April 23, 2012) is an American child actor, widely known for his critically acclaimed role in the drama film Minari, for which he was nominated for a BAFTA Award for Best Actor in a Supporting Role.

Early life
Kim was born in Chicago but moved with his parents to Irvine, California. He spoke Korean as his first language and has a first degree black belt in taekwondo.

Acting career
At age 7, Kim was cast as David Yi in the 2020 film Minari, for which he won the 2021 Critics' Choice Movie Awards for Best Young Performer and was nominated for a BAFTA award for Best Actor in a Supporting Role, becoming one of the category's youngest nominees. Before Minari, the only "acting" he had done was in an ad for Pottery Barn Kids.

In January 2021, it was announced that Kim would star in Latchkey Kids alongside Elsie Fisher. And in March 2021, it was announced that Kim would star in the second season of Awkwafina Is Nora from Queens as the young version of Wally, the father of title character Awkwafina.

In January 2022, Kim was cast in multi-starrer film IF written and directed by John Krasinski.

Awards and nominations

References

External links
  
 Alan Kim (age 8) - Minari film i/v by Jimmy Kimmel   https://www.youtube.com/watch?v=8YT63mIzpBo 

Living people
2012 births
21st-century American male actors
American male actors of Korean descent
American male child actors
American male film actors
Male actors from Chicago
People from Irvine, California